Seun Sangga  is a shopping area located between Jongno 3-ga and Toegyero 3-ga, Jongno-gu, Seoul. It was built in 1966, in what The Hankyoreh described in an editorial as "a symbol of the indiscriminate redevelopment that occurred during the dictatorship years". In the 1970s, it became known for its pornography vendors; however, in the late 1990s, business declined due to the rise of internet pornography.

Redevelopment 
Since its outdated, there were several redevelopment plans about this shopping area. In 2006, Jung-gu suggested a plan to build a megatall skyscraper with the height of 960m and 220-storied, known as Tour Financial Hub Center, but due to the height restriction of Seoul central, the project was abandoned.

References

Further reading 

Streets in Seoul